Jang So-yeon (Korean:장소연; born Seo Eun-jung on 28 January 1980) is a South Korean actress. She is alumni of Sookmyung Women's University, Department of English and Chinese. She made her acting debut in 2001, since then, she has appeared in number of plays, films and television series. She is known for her roles in My Father Is Strange (2017), Something in the Rain (2018) and Crash Landing on You (2019). She has acted in films such as: Veteran (2015) and Peninsula (2020) among others.

Career
Jang So-yeon is a graduate in English and Chinese from Sookmyung Women's University. She is a member of the theater company 'Yeonwoo Stage'. She has appeared in My Lawyer, Mr. Jo (2016), While You Were Sleeping (2017), The Secret Life of My Secretary (2019), and Welcome 2 Life (2019).

In 2018 she appeared in JTBC's TV series Something in the Rain as Seo Kyung-seon, for her performance she won the best supporting actress award at 6th APAN Star Awards.

In 2019-20 she played Hyun Myeong-sun, a North Korean housewife in tvN's romantic drama Crash Landing on You, which is the third highest-rated South Korean TV drama in cable television history. Jang's performance was appreciated as she pulled off the role with her natural North Korean dialect.

In 2021 Jang was appreciated for her performance as Kang Mi-ra, a mother who had a child abducted 11 years ago, in JTBC Drama festa Missing Child.

In 2022 Jang is appearing in JTBC's office romantic drama Forecasting Love and Weather and cast in Disney+ Sci-fi thriller Grid as Choi Seon-ul, the deputy director of the secretariat for 25 years. In September, Jang signed an exclusive contract with Clover Company.

Filmography

Films

Television series

Theater

Awards and nominations

References

External links
 
 Jang So-yeon on Daum 
 Jang So-yeon on KMDb

21st-century South Korean actresses
South Korean film actresses
South Korean television actresses
Living people
1980 births
Sookmyung Women's University alumni
Best Supporting Actress for APAN Star Awards winners
Actresses from Seoul